The 2019 season was Felda United's 13th competitive season and 1st season in the Malaysia Super League since the club's promotion to the Malaysia Super League after only a one-year absence, winning the Malaysia Premier League. The club's license from the Football Association of Malaysia (FAM) has been obtained to continue their tracks in the Malaysian Football League.

Background 
In 2018, Felda United won the Premier League on their first season in the league. They played in the second-tier division due to complications in obtaining the club's license to play in the Super League in 2019. The team huddled through the season until they became champion in the guidance of then head coach, B. Sathianathan and then captain, Shukor Adan.

In the Malaysia FA Cup, Felda United was up against PKNP in the quarter finals. The team managed to score 1–0 in their first leg during the away match. Sadly, PKNP bust the team with a score of 1–2 in the second leg, leaving PKNP with the upper hand to continue in the semi finals.

Meanwhile, in the Malaysia Cup, Felda United was grouped with 3 other competitive clubs which were the PDRM, Melaka United and PKNP in Group B. Felda United managed to place second in the group with 10 points, after PKNS being placed first with 13 points. The team however failed to qualify into semifinals as they got dunked by Terengganu, with defeats in both first leg and second leg with a score of 1–2 and 3–4. The aggregate sides Terengganu with a 4–6 victory.

However, throughout the end of 2018, Felda United was bummed with financial issues, the players and the coaches weren't paid for 3 months since the 2018 Malaysian Election. The situation was a blur and Felda United had to drop their key players and change all four of their previous import players including Thiago Fernandes due to budget cut in order to face the Super League in 2019. This season, the club will be represented by young, fresh and talented players but lacking of experience to play in the top flight, as mentioned by Christie Jayaseelan.

Despite the disappointing ending for the 2018 season, the club signed three new import players and retained one of Felda United's Brazilian import player, Thiago Junio. Thiago Junio played very well in the previous season and he is back to be Felda United's shield. Besides Thiago, the club introduced three import players which are Jaycee John from Bahrain, Kei Ikeda from Japan and another Brazil-born player, Jocinei.

Friendlies

Friendlies

Competitions

Malaysia Super League

League table

Fixtures and results

Malaysia FA Cup

Malaysia Cup

Group stage

Squad information

Club Statistics

Appearances and goals

Transfers and contracts

In 
First leg

Second leg

Out 
First leg

Second leg

References 

Felda United F.C.
Malaysian football clubs 2019 season